Gulaga, dual-named as Mount Dromedary and also referred to as Mount Gulaga, is mountain located in the south coast region of New South Wales, Australia. It rises above the village of Central Tilba and is within the Gulaga National Park.

History

Aboriginal significance
Gulaga is the place of ancestral origin within the mythology of the Yuin people, the Aboriginal people of the area. Gulaga itself symbolises the mother and provides a basis for Aboriginal spiritual identity; the mountain as well as the surrounding area holds particular significance for Aboriginal women. For the Yuin people it is seen as a place of cultural origin. The mountain is regarded as a symbolic mother-figure providing the basis for the people's spiritual identity. Gulaga, the mother, has two sons: Barunguba, also known as Montague Island, and Najanuka, named Little Dromedary by Europeans. The story tells that her second son was not allow to go far from home, as his elder brother did, and that Gulaga can see her both her sons in the distance.

European discovery and mining
The first Europeans to sight the mountain were the crew of Captain Cook's ship, HMS Endeavour on 21 April 1770. Cook named it "Mount Dromedary", as its figure reminded him of the hump of a camel.

In the mid-1800s Mount Dromedary, became a prominent site of gold mining. Rev. W.B. Clarke first found traces of alluvium gold in Dignams Creek in 1852. Gold mining then became a common activity in the area. A significant amount of gold was found in deposits along streams coming from Gulaga's slopes. Near the crest of Gulaga, reefs were discovered in 1877 that allowed for gold mineralisation.

21st century
In May 2006 the Gulaga National Park, incorporating the former Wallaga Lake National Park, was handed back to its traditional owners, the Yuin people, in a historic agreement signed by the NSW Environment Minister and the Yuin people. The agreement also included Biamanga National Park, which incorporates Mumbulla Mountain, the "men's mountain".

After a period of community consultation from mid-2021, The mountain was officially assigned the dual names of Gulaga and Mount Dromedary on 30 November 2021. Signage would place Gulaga first and the European name underneath it, reflecting the importance of the Dhurga language, history and traditions. At the same time, Little Dromedary Mountain was dual-named Najanuka / Little Dromedary Mountain, and the island Barunguba / Montague Island.

Geology
Its eruptions formed both Najanuka / Little Dromedary to the east and Baranguba/ Montague Island. What remains today is the inner core of the original volcano. It has been dormant since end of the Cretaceous (65 million years ago).

Gulaga is thus an igneous rock complex, known as Mount Dromedary Igneous Complex. It comprises a group of igneous and extrusive rocks of the Shoshonite association. There are also Ordovician sediments to the east and west of the villages of Central Tilba and Tilba Tilba. The mountain is composed of banatite ("a rock of intermediate composition between quartz diorite and quartz monzonite". There is an outer layer of monzonite around the banatite core main core of Gulaga, probably emplaced by the vertical movement of magma which created intrusion into the surrounding Ordovician sediments. There are dykes within the complex, mainly composed of dolerite or quartz feldspar.

Activities
Gulaga is located within the  Gulaga National Park and the area serves as a site for public activity as well as a place of significance for the Aboriginal peoples. The national park provides walkways along the mining roads, which provide views of the coastal lakes. Though it is steep in a few places along the way, it is a fairly leisurely hike, requiring no special hiking equipment.

The lakes can be accessed by boat, which can be rented from Regatta Point or Beauty Point.

Gallery

See also

 List of mountains of New South Wales

References

Further reading

Gulaga
South Coast (New South Wales)